Patricia Janeshutz MacGregor (born June 7, 1947) writes most of her award-winning mysteries under the pen name of T.J. MacGregor.  As Alison Drake, she wrote five novels and as Trish Janeshutz she wrote two. As Trish J MacGregor, she wrote the trilogy The Hungry Ghosts. As Trish MacGregor, she has written dozens nonfiction books that reflect her interests - synchronicity, precognition, astrology, the tarot, dreams, and yoga.  In 2003, with the death of renowned astrologer Sydney Omarr, MacGregor took over the writing of his astrology books, several of which are co authored with husband, Rob MacGregor.

Biography

Born and raised in Caracas, Venezuela, T. J. MacGregor is bilingual and feels a deep kinship with South America. She has a B.A. in Spanish, and a Master's in Library and Information Science.  Before she sold her first novel in 1984, her jobs were all over the map. She taught English to Cuban refugees, Spanish to hormonal teenagers, was a social worker, and a librarian and Spanish teacher in a correctional facility for youthful offenders. Her best job was leading travel writing trips with her husband, writer and novelist Rob MacGregor, to the Peruvian Amazon.  She lives in South Florida with her husband, their teenage daughter, and a menagerie of pets.

T.J. has written 42 novels, which include three different series – the Quin St. James/Mike McCleary and the Tango Key series, a trilogy, The Hungry Ghosts, as well as a number of stand-alone thrillers including Out of Sight, which won the Edgar Allan Poe Award for Best Paperback Original of 2002. Her most recent novel is U R Mine (2016).

Trish and husband, Rob, co author the synchrosecret blog that consists of over 3000 posts that explores their perspective on what synchronicity isn't and is:

"Synchronicity isn’t the voice of a god or a devil or an inner twin. It is non-exclusive. It belongs to everyone. Anyone, from any walk of life, can experience it, learn from it, and enrich their lives."""
"Synchronicity is the coming together of inner and outer events in a way that is meaningful to the observer and which cannot be explained by cause and effect.  Or: meaningful coincidence.

Bibliography

As T.J. MacGregor

The Quin St. James/Mike McCleary series

 Dark Fields – 1986 – Ballantine Books – 
 Kill Flash – 1987 – Ballantine Books – 
 Death Sweet – 1988 – Ballantine Books – 
 On Ice – 1989 – Ballantine Books  – 
 Kin Dread – 1990 – Ballantine Books – 
 Death Flats – 1991 – Ballantine Books – 
 Spree – 1992 – Ballantine Books – 
 Storm Surge – 1993 – Hyperion – 
 Blue Pearl – 1994 – Hyperion – 
 Mistress of the Bones – 1995 – Hyperion – 

The Tango Key Series

 Hanged Man – 1999 – P Mass Paper – 
 Black Water – 2003 – Pinnacle – 
 Total Silence – 2004 – Pinnacle – 
 Category Five – 2005 – Pinnacle – 
 Cold as Death – 2006 – Pinnacle – 

Stand-Alone Thrillers

 The Seventh Sense – 2000 – Pinnacle – 
 Vanished – 2001- Kensington Books – 
 The Other Extreme – 2001 – Pinnacle – 
 Out of Sight – 2002 – Pinnacle – 
 Kill Time – 2007 – Pinnacle – 
 Running Time - 2008 - Pinnacle -

As Trish Janeshutz

 In Shadow – 1985 – Random House – 
 Hidden Lake – 1987 – Random House – 
 The Making of Miami Vice, c-author Rob MacGregor – 1986 – Random House –

As Alison Drake

 Tango Key – 1988 – Random House – 
 Fevered – 1988 – Random House – 
 Black Moon – 1989 – Random House – 
 High Strangeness – 1992 – Random House – 
 Lagoon (horror) – 1990 – Ballantine Books –

As Trish MacGregor

 The Everything Astrology Book – 1998 – Adams Media – 
 Your Cosmic Kids: Using Astrology to Understand Your Children – 1999 – Hampton Roads Publishing – 
 Your Intuitive Moon: Using Lunar Signs & Cycles to Enhance Your Intuition – 2000 – NAL – 
 Creative Stars: Using Astrology to Tap Your Muse – 2002 – St. Martin's Griffin – 
 Your Story in the Stars – 2003 – St. Martin's Griffin – 
 Mars and Sex: The Secrets of Sexual Astrology – 2004 – Citadel – 
 Soul Mate Astrology: How to Find and Keep Your Ideal Mate Through the Wisdom of the Stars – 2004 – Rockport Publishers – 
 The Everything Magic & Spells Book – 2000 – Adams Media – 
 The Everything Dreams Book, co-author Rob MacGregor – 1997 – Adams Media Corporation – 
 The Lotus & the Stars: The Way of Astro-Yoga, co-author Rob MacGregor – 2001 – McGraw Hill – 
 Power Tarot, co-author Phyllis Vega – 1998 – Simon & Schuster – 
 Animal Totems, co-author Millie Gemondo – 2004 – Rockport Publishers – 
 Sydney Omarr's Spirit Guides – 2003 – Signet –

As Trish J. MacGregor

The Hungry Ghosts
 Esperanza, Tor Books,2011 
 Ghost Key, Tor Books, 2012 
 Apparition, Tor Books, 2013

Awards

Edgar Allan Poe Award for Best Paperback Original of 2002 for Out of Sight.

References and sources

External links
T. J. MacGregor Website
Romantic Times Book Reviews T.J. MacGregor Author Profile
Mystery Book Awards
Learn Astrology: An Interview with Trish MacGregor

Living people
Venezuelan emigrants to the United States
20th-century American novelists
21st-century American novelists
American astrologers
20th-century astrologers
21st-century astrologers
American fantasy writers
American thriller writers
American women novelists
Women science fiction and fantasy writers
20th-century American women writers
21st-century American women writers
Women thriller writers
Pseudonymous women writers
1947 births
20th-century pseudonymous writers
21st-century pseudonymous writers